Latvian Military Police (MP) provide military discipline and legal order in the National Armed Forces of Latvia. They were established in 1997. After merging with the Latvian Security Service in 2009, the Military Police is also responsible for security of the Parliament and the President of Latvia.

Mission 

The Military Police carries out military discipline and ensuring lawful provision functions with the right to perform investigations and operational activities, and prepares Military Police units for their deployment to international missions. It safeguards military and strategically important sites, provides escort and security of military transport columns, military cargoes, as well as of state and foreign officials. The Military Police provides for the exchange of classified materials  between the state institutions of Latvia, institutions of NATO member states and other competent foreign institutions.

The main mission of the Military Police is to:
Assist in the provision of security during military events and provide military discipline, law and order;
Guard objects as ordered by the NAF Commander;
Control military traffic, escort officials and guard military cargo.

Cooperation 

One of their priorities is to establish an MP unit for participation in NATO-led international operations. MP soldiers have participated in the peacekeeping mission in Kosovo since 1999. In addition, the first MP unit was deployed in Iraq in 2003. MP soldiers are always well-prepared for their work on these missions, thus their input is always highly appreciated.

References

External links 
 Ministry of Defense of the Republic of Latvia
 Mission of Latvia to NATO

Military of Latvia
Law enforcement agencies of Latvia
Military units and formations established in 1997